The 1839 Michigan gubernatorial election was held from November 4, 1839 to November 5, 1839. Whig nominee William Woodbridge defeated Democrat nominee Elon Farnsworth with 51.64% of the vote.

This was the most recent election in which neither a Republican or Democrat won.

General election

Candidates
Major party candidates
William Woodbridge, Whig
Elon Farnsworth, Democratic

Results

References

1839
Michigan
Gubernatorial
November 1839 events